Relations between Israel and the Czech Republic, and its predecessor state Czechoslovakia, have varied widely over time. Initially warm, Czechoslovakia-Israel relations deteriorated, and the two countries did not have diplomatic relations during most of the Communist rule in Czechoslovakia. However, after the Velvet Revolution and dissolution of Czechoslovakia the countries re-established contact, and the Czech Republic is now one of Israel's closest allies, frequently demonstrating strong support for Israel at the United Nations and within the European Union.

In March 2021, the Czech Republic opened a diplomatic office in Jerusalem.

History

Israeli relations with Czechoslovakia
The founder of Czechoslovakia, President Tomáš Garrigue Masaryk, had close relations with Jews and the Zionist Movement. In 1920 he became the first statesman to visit Palestine's first Jewish kibbutz.

Czechoslovakia was one of 33 countries to vote in favour of the 1947 UN partition resolution recommending the establishment of a Jewish state, and was among the first countries to recognize the State of Israel, which it did on May 18, 1948, four days after Israel's declaration. Diplomatic relations between the countries were established on July 3, 1948, four months after the Communists seized power in Czechoslovakia. Czechoslovakia supported the newly created Israeli state for several months with military aircraft and weapons. However the Communist government later ceased this support and within a few years diplomatic relations were broken.

Following the 1989 Velvet Revolution, diplomatic relations were re-established between Israel and newly-democratic Czechoslovakia.

Israeli relations with the Czech Republic
After the dissolution of Czechoslovakia in 1993, diplomatic relations were established between Israel and the two successor states, the Czech Republic and Slovakia.

In December 2008 the Czech Air Force wanted to train in desert conditions for the upcoming mission in Afghanistan, and Israel offered their desert areas for this purpose, to thank the Czechs for training Israeli pilots when the country was first established.

The current Czech government is one of Israel's closest allies. After the Gaza flotilla raid the Czech Republic expressed its support for Israel. President of the Senate Přemysl Sobotka visited Israel on June 2, 2010 and addressed the Israeli Knesset, describing the flotilla as a planned provocation designed to entrap Israel. Sobotka met with Knesset Speaker Reuven Rivlin and expressed support for the classification of Hamas as a terrorist organization.

In a United Nations General Assembly vote on 29 November 2012, the Czech Republic was the only European country to vote with Israel against upgrading the status of Palestine to a "non-member observer state".

During a visit to Prague in May 2012, Israeli Prime Minister Benjamin Netanyahu said that Israel had "no better friend in Europe than the Czech Republic". During a visit to Israel in November 2014, Czech Foreign Minister Lubomír Zaorálek claimed that Czech media and society viewed Israel as "a trusted friend, a vibrant democracy, and an economic and technological powerhouse", adding that the Czech Republic had one of the lowest levels of anti-Semitism in Europe.  In 2015, Israel Foreign Affairs Minister Moshe Arens described Czech-Israel relations as "excellent", and the best of all nations in the European Union.

In December 2015 the Czech Parliament refused to implement European Union guidelines to label Israeli products originating from the West Bank, East Jerusalem and the Golan Heights. Czech lawmakers described the rules as anti-Semitic, and discrimination against "the only democracy in the Middle East". Israel's ambassador Gary Koren thanked the parliament for its decision.

In October 2016 Czech Parliament passed a motion condemning a UNESCO resolution on Palestine which omitted reference to the Jewish heritage of the Western Wall and other historical sites in Jerusalem, with deputies accusing UNESCO of antisemitism and describing the resolution as "hateful" during the parliamentary discussion. Ofir Akunis, Israeli Minister of Science, Technology and Space, thanked the Czech Parliament and the country, describing it as a "heroic act" and reaffirming the close relationship between the countries.

In May 2017 the Chamber of Deputies passed a non-binding resolution condemning another UNESCO resolution critical of Israel, and calling on the Czech government to advocate recognition of Jerusalem as the capital of Israel. The resolution also called for the Czech Republic to withhold its annual funding to UNESCO.

On 22 October 2019, the Chamber of Deputies passed a non-binding resolution "condemn[ing] all activities and statements by groups calling for a boycott of the State of Israel, its goods, services or citizens." The resolution was introduced by Jan Bartošek, leader of the Populars caucus in the chamber.

On 11 March 2021, Czech Prime Minister Andrej Babiš opened the Czech diplomatic office in Jerusalem, the second European Union country to do so, after Hungary.

Israeli President Isaac Herzog made a state visit to the Czech Republic in July 2022. At Prague Castle, President Herzog awarded the Israeli Presidential Medal of Honor to Czech President Miloš Zeman, hailing his Czech counterpart’s “deep friendship with the Jewish People, his consistent support for Israel on the international stage, and his ’zero tolerance’ policy toward terrorism and antisemitism.”

Country comparison

Diplomatic offices and co-operation
The Czech Republic has an embassy in Tel Aviv and 3 honorary consulates (in Haifa, Jerusalem and Ramat Gan). Israel has an embassy in Prague. Both countries are full members of the Union for the Mediterranean.

See also
 History of the Jews in the Czech Republic
 International recognition of Israel

References

External links
  Czech embassy in Tel Aviv
  Israeli embassy in Prague

 
Israel 
Bilateral relations of Israel